Göksu Hasancik (born 11 February 1987, in Germany) is a German retired footballer.

Career

In 2004/05, Hasancik was offered a contract by Beşiktaş J.K., one of the most successful Turkish clubs, but rejected it due to wanting to finish school.

In 2006/07, he was offered a contract by Fenerbahçe S.K., another of the most successful Turkish clubs. However, the transfer never happened.

After failing to make an appearance with Mardinspor and Fatih Karagümrük S.K. in the Turkish second division, he signed for Slovakian side DAC 1904 Dunajská Streda.

For the 2011 season, Hasancik signed for Estonian club Tartu JK Tammeka, becoming the ethnically Turkish player to play there.

In 2011, he signed for Turan-Tovuz IK in the Azerbaijani top flight, making 1 league appearance before spending the rest of his career with Turkish lower league outfits Çankırıspor and Orduspor.

References

External links
 Göksu Hasancik at Soccerway

Association football goalkeepers
Living people
German footballers
1987 births
Footballers from Munich
Orduspor footballers
German people of Turkish descent